Richard Marceau (born August 25, 1970) is a Canadian politician.

Marceau was born in Charlesbourg, Quebec City. A lawyer in both Québec and Ontario, Marceau was first elected to the House of Commons of Canada in the 1997 federal election for the Bloc Québécois in the riding of Charlesbourg at the age of 26. He was re-elected in the 2000 election in the riding of Charlesbourg—Jacques-Cartier and again in the 2004 election in the riding of Charlesbourg. He has served as the Bloc's critic to the Solicitor General, International Trade, Indian Affairs and Northern Development, Intergovernmental Affairs, and the Privy Council. He was their  critic to the Minister of Justice and the Minister of Public Safety and Emergency Preparedness until his defeat in the 2006 election.

He ran unsuccessfully as the Parti Québécois candidate in Charlesbourg in the 2007 Quebec election.

Marceau converted to Judaism in 2004, 10 years after his marriage to Lori Beckerman. He had co-chaired the Canada-Israel Inter-Parliamentary Friendship Group and sponsored a bill establishing a national Holocaust remembrance day. He described himself as a "pro-Palestinian Zionist" in an op-ed piece he wrote for the Ottawa Citizen.

From 2006 to 2011, Marceau worked for the Canada-Israel Committee. Since 2011, he has worked for the Centre for Israel and Jewish Affairs as a senior advisor. In 2011, he published A Quebec Jew: From Bloc Québécois MP to Jewish Activist, detailing his spiritual journey and involvement in the Jewish community.

References

External links
 

1970 births
Bloc Québécois MPs
Canadian memoirists
Canadian Zionists
Converts to Judaism
Jewish Canadian politicians
Jewish Canadian writers
Living people
Members of the House of Commons of Canada from Quebec
Politicians from Quebec City
Writers from Quebec City
École nationale d'administration alumni
21st-century Canadian politicians
21st-century Canadian writers
21st-century memoirists